Igor Aleksandrovich Kravchuk (born September 13, 1966) is a Russian former ice hockey defenceman, who spent several seasons in the Soviet League and then in the National Hockey League and also competed internationally for the Soviet Union, Unified Team, and Russia.

Playing career
Kravchuk started his NHL career in 1992 with the Chicago Blackhawks, who drafted him 71st overall in the 1991 NHL Entry Draft. Kravchuk scored in his first NHL game.  He would also spend time with the Edmonton Oilers, St. Louis Blues, Ottawa Senators, Calgary Flames and Florida Panthers. In all, Kravchuk played in 699 regular season games, scoring 64 goals and 210 assists for 274 points, collecting 251 penalty minutes.  He also played in 51 playoff games, scoring 6 goals and 15 assists for 21 points, collecting 18 penalty minutes. Kravchuk was also a member of the Unified Team that won the gold medal at the 1992 Winter Olympics.

Two days after his 21st birthday Kravchuk was the lone defenceman facing a 3 on 1 in the final game of the 1987 Canada Cup. Mario Lemieux, Wayne Gretzky, and Larry Murphy skated in on goaltender Sergei Mylnikov and Lemieux scored the game and series winning goal at 18:34 of the third period. In addition to his 1992 Olympic gold medal, Kravchuk also won gold with the Soviet team in 1988, and two medals (silver in 1998 and bronze in 2002) with Russia. He also won numerous world championship medals at all levels. Kravchuk has two sons; Ilya and Christopher.

Career statistics

Regular season and playoffs

International

References

External links

1966 births
Living people
Calgary Flames players
Chicago Blackhawks draft picks
Chicago Blackhawks players
Edmonton Oilers players
Florida Panthers players
HC CSKA Moscow players
Ice hockey players at the 1988 Winter Olympics
Ice hockey players at the 1992 Winter Olympics
Ice hockey players at the 1998 Winter Olympics
Ice hockey players at the 2002 Winter Olympics
Medalists at the 1988 Winter Olympics
Medalists at the 1992 Winter Olympics
Medalists at the 1998 Winter Olympics
Medalists at the 2002 Winter Olympics
National Hockey League All-Stars
Olympic bronze medalists for Russia
Olympic gold medalists for the Soviet Union
Olympic gold medalists for the Unified Team
Olympic ice hockey players of Russia
Olympic ice hockey players of the Soviet Union
Olympic ice hockey players of the Unified Team
Olympic medalists in ice hockey
Olympic silver medalists for Russia
Ottawa Senators players
Russian ice hockey defencemen
St. Louis Blues players
Salavat Yulaev Ufa players
Soviet ice hockey defencemen
Sportspeople from Ufa